Sclerococcum is a genus of lichenicolous fungi in the family Dactylosporaceae.

Taxonomy

The genus was circumscribed in 1825 by Elias Magnus Fries. The type species is Sclerococcum sphaerale, originally described in 1814 by Erik Acharius (as Spiloma sphaerale). This fungus is a lichenicolous hyphomycete – a mould that lives on a lichen. Most of the Sclerococcum species described since then are also lichenicolous, and most have a restricted host range. Molecular phylogenetic analysis published in 2012 showed that Sclerococcum sphaerale grouped together in a clade with species of Dactylospora in the class Eurotiomycetes.

In 2016, Réblová and colleagues proposed a new family Sclerococcaceae in a new order (Sclerococcales) to accommodate the type genus Sclerococcum, Dactylospora, Rhopalophora, three strains of beetle-associated fungi, and an isolate of Fusichalara minuta. This classification was not accepted in the 2017 Outline of the Ascomycota, which retained the family Dactylosporaceae.

Species
Sclerococcum acarosporae 
Sclerococcum acarosporicola 
Sclerococcum aeruginosum 
Sclerococcum ahtii 
Sclerococcum allantoideum 
Sclerococcum amygdalariae 
Sclerococcum anziae 
Sclerococcum aptrootii 
Sclerococcum areolatum 
Sclerococcum arthrobotryinum 
Sclerococcum aspiciliicola 
Sclerococcum athallinum 
Sclerococcum attendendum 
Sclerococcum australe 
Sclerococcum bloxamii 
Sclerococcum boreale 
Sclerococcum caledonicum 
Sclerococcum canariense 
Sclerococcum cladoniicola 
Sclerococcum crassitunicatum 
Sclerococcum crassum 
Sclerococcum davidii 
Sclerococcum deminutum 
Sclerococcum dendriscostictae  – India
Sclerococcum dobrowolskii 
Sclerococcum epicladonia 
Sclerococcum epimyces 
Sclerococcum epiphytorum 
Sclerococcum ewersii  – Australia
Sclerococcum fissurinae  – Alaska
Sclerococcum frigidum 
Sclerococcum gelidarium 
Sclerococcum glaucomarioides 
Sclerococcum griseisporodochium 
Sclerococcum hafellnerianum 
Sclerococcum haliotrephum 
Sclerococcum heterodermiae 
Sclerococcum homoclinellum 
Sclerococcum imperfectum 
Sclerococcum inconspicuum 
Sclerococcum inopinum 
Sclerococcum inquilinum 
Sclerococcum leuckertii 
Sclerococcum lobariellum 
Sclerococcum luridum 
Sclerococcum mangrovei 
Sclerococcum mediterraneum 
Sclerococcum microsporum 
Sclerococcum montagnei  – Macaronesia
Sclerococcum olivaceum 
Sclerococcum ophthalmizae 
Sclerococcum orygmaeum 
Sclerococcum parasitaster 
Sclerococcum parasiticum 
Sclerococcum parellarium 
Sclerococcum pertusariicola 
Sclerococcum phaeophysciae 
Sclerococcum phyllobaeis 
Sclerococcum physciae  – India
Sclerococcum pleiospermum 
Sclerococcum polysporum 
Sclerococcum porphyreum 
Sclerococcum protothallinum 
Sclerococcum pseudourceolatum 
Sclerococcum purpurascens 
Sclerococcum pyrenaicum 
Sclerococcum rhyparizae 
Sclerococcum ricasoliae 
Sclerococcum rimulicola 
Sclerococcum rostrupii 
Sclerococcum rubiginosum 
Sclerococcum saxatile 
Sclerococcum serusiauxii 
Sclerococcum simplex 
Sclerococcum sipmanii 
Sclerococcum sphaerale 
Sclerococcum stipitatum 
Sclerococcum stygium 
Sclerococcum suburceolatum 
Sclerococcum tegularum 
Sclerococcum tephromelarum 
Sclerococcum thelotrematicola 
Sclerococcum toensbergii 
Sclerococcum urceolatum 
Sclerococcum verrucisporum 
Sclerococcum verruculosum 
Sclerococcum vrijmoediae

References

Lecanorales
Lecanorales genera
Lichenicolous fungi
Taxa described in 1819
Taxa named by Elias Magnus Fries